The Frank Sinatra Show (also known as Bulova Watch Time) is an American musical variety series hosted by Frank Sinatra from 1950 to 1952. The series aired on CBS on Saturdays the first season and on Tuesdays for the second year. As with many variety shows of the time, the show was broadcast live and was recorded via kinescope. Some episodes were 30 minutes long while others lasted for 60 minutes. At least one episode aired in a 45-minute time-slot.

Overview
Hosted by Frank Sinatra, the series was sponsored by Bulova Watches. Sinatra would perform songs and sketches with his guests. The series is reportedly in the public domain.

In his book The Forgotten Network: DuMont and the Birth of American Television (2004), David Weinstein claims that the surprise popularity of the DuMont Television Network series Life Is Worth Living in 1952 was the final blow that led to the cancellation of The Frank Sinatra Show. He notes that controversy surrounding Sinatra's affair with Ava Gardner, along with several unpopular singles, had caused ratings to slip.

Life Is Worth Living, which averaged about 10 million viewers at a time when there were four major television networks in the United States, eroded the ratings of the show even further, to the point that The Frank Sinatra Show finally left the air.

Guest stars

Brian Aherne
Don Ameche
Eddie 'Rochester' Anderson
The Andrews Sisters
Toni Arden
Louis Armstrong
Eileen Barton
Jack Benny
Milton Berle
Larry J. Blake
Mari Blanchard
Joan Blondell
Eric Blore
Ben Blue (regular performer)
Victor Borge
Jimmy Boyd
Joe Bushkin
Jean Carroll
Perry Como
Jackie Coogan
Broderick Crawford
Arlene Dahl
Dagmar
Cass Daley
Denise Darcel
Laraine Day
Yvonne De Carlo
George DeWitt
Leo Durocher
Faye Emerson
Douglas Fairbanks, Jr.
Sidney Fields
Frank Fontaine
Tennessee Ernie Ford
Phil Foster
Zsa Zsa Gabor
Jack Gilford
Jackie Gleason
Larry Griswold
Edmund Gwenn
Toni Harper
Dick Haymes
Skitch Henderson
June Hutton (regular performer)
Beatrice Kay
Betty and Jane Kean
Buster Keaton
Pert Kelton
Irv Kupcinet
Frankie Laine
Muriel Landers
Joe Laurie, Jr.
Peggy Lee
Ben Lessy
Liberace
Diana Lynn
Hal March and Bob Sweeney
James Mason
Pamela Mason
Marilyn Maxwell
Mike Mazurki
George McManus
Borrah Minevitch
Garry Moore
Patricia Morison
Alan Mowbray
Jan Murray
J. Carrol Naish
Conrad Nagel
The Pied Pipers
Roger Price
Basil Rathbone
John Serry Sr. (accordion accompanist)
Phil Silvers
Walter Slezak
Smith & Dale
Harold J. Stone
Yma Sumac
Grady Sutton
George Tobias
The Three Stooges
Rudy Vallée
Sarah Vaughan
Nancy Walker
Marie Wilson
Alan Young

References

External links
 

The Frank Sinatra Show (1950–52)

1950 American television series debuts
1952 American television series endings
CBS original programming
1950s American variety television series
Frank Sinatra
American live television series
Black-and-white American television shows
English-language television shows